COPUS (Creation of Peace Under Stars) is a rap jazz fusion ensemble based in San Francisco.

Formed by poet Royal Kent and composer Wendy Loomis in 1998, the group has performed at clubs, theaters, and festivals in the San Francisco Bay Area, Los Angeles, Nashville, and Atlanta, Boston, and at the WordxWord Festival in Western Massachusetts. The group has released a CD Later Than You Think, a single "The Fool", the trilogy Jah Provide and is currently working on their next full-length recording.

Current Band Members Include:  Wendy Loomis/Composer/Pianist; Royal Kent/Poet/Spoken Word Artist; Monica Williams/All Flutes; Patrick Mahon/Electric/Upright Bass and Greg McCray/Drums.

“COPUS could become legendary if given the opportunity to thrive!” -Michael Allison, MusicDish.com

Discography

Jah Provide
"Jah Provide" was released in 2008 under COPUS Music.  It includes the three singles:

"King Solomon Lock"
"Let Jah Children Speak"
"Jah Provide"

Natty Dread

"Natty Dread" is a single available on iTunes released Feb 2011.

References

External links 
 Copus Music 
 Copus Music Catalog 
 Copus Facebook 

American jazz ensembles from California